Alexander Brody may refer to:
Sándor Bródy (writer) (1863–1924), Hungarian author and journalist
Sandy Brody (born 1967), American racing driver
Sándor Bródy (footballer) (1884–1944), Hungarian football player
Alexander Brody (businessman) (1933–2022), Hungarian business executive and writer

See also
Alexander Brodie (disambiguation)